Assumption High School may refer to:

In the United States 
Assumption High School (Iowa), Davenport, Iowa
Assumption High School (Kentucky), Louisville, Kentucky
Assumption High School (Louisiana), a school in Assumption Parish, Louisiana
Assumption Preparatory School or Assumption High School, a school in Worcester, Massachusetts
Assumption High School (Wisconsin), Wisconsin Rapids, Wisconsin

See also
Assumption College Catholic High School, Windsor, Ontario
Assumption College School (Brantford), Brantford, Ontario
Assumption Secondary School, Burlington, Ontario